Granite Peak-Northwest Peak is in the Beartooth Mountains in the U.S. state of Montana. If considered a distinct peak, it is the second tallest mountain in Montana. Granite Peak-Northwest Peak is in the Absaroka-Beartooth Wilderness on the border of Custer and Gallatin National Forests.

References

Granite Peak-Northwest Peak
Beartooth Mountains
Mountains of Park County, Montana